Tropidophorus laotus, the Laotian water skink or Laotian keeled skink,  is a species of skink found in Laos and Thailand.

References

laotus
Reptiles of Laos
Reptiles of Thailand
Reptiles described in 1923
Taxa named by Malcolm Arthur Smith